Benediction are a British death metal band formed in 1989. Their first album, Subconscious Terror, was released in 1990. Their latest album , Scriptures, was released in 2020.

Members
Current
 Peter Rewinsky – lead guitar (1989–present)
 Darren Brookes – rhythm guitar (1989–present)
 Dave Ingram – vocals (1991–1998, 2019–present)
 Giovanni Durst – drums (2019–present)
 Nik Sampson – bass (2023–present)

Former
 Mark "Barney" Greenway – vocals (1989–1990)
 Paul Adams – bass (1989–1991)
 Ian Treacy – drums (1989–1993)
 Frank Healy – bass (1992–2017)
 Neil Hutton – drums (1994–2005)
 Dave Hunt – vocals (1998–2019)
 Nicholas Barker – drums (2005–2011)
 Perra Karlsson – drums (2011–2013)
 Ashley Guest – drums (2013–2019)
 Dan Bate – bass (2018–2023)

Timeline

Discography
Studio albums
Subconscious Terror (1990)
The Grand Leveller (1991)
Transcend the Rubicon (1993)
The Dreams You Dread (1995)
Grind Bastard (1998)
Organised Chaos (2001)
Killing Music (2008)
Scriptures (2020)

References

External links
Official Benediction Myspace page
Benediction on stage – 2008

1988 establishments in England
English death metal musical groups
Musical groups from Birmingham, West Midlands
Musical groups established in 1988
Musical quintets
Nuclear Blast artists